Michael William Hart  (3 December 1943 – 22 June 2016) was an English singer-songwriter and poet.

In 1962, he founded the band The Roadrunners, before leaving in 1965 to join The Liverpool Scene, a poetry and music collective, with Adrian Henri, Andy Roberts, and Mike Evans. After recording one album with them he had a solo album, Mike Hart Bleeds, produced by John Peel, on Peel's Dandelion Records label.

He recorded a second solo album with Dandelion; Basher, Chalky, Pongo and Me.

In 1980 he began work on a third solo project. Five tracks were recorded, but none were released. They have been rediscovered, remastered, and put online.

He died on 22 June 2016 at the age of 72.

Discography

with The Roadrunners
 "Twist Time im Star-Club Hamburg - 4" (Ariola   S 71 225 IT), German release 1964
 "Rock Generation Vol. 5 – The First Rhythm & Blues Festival In England" (2 tracks from the band as ‘The Liverpool Roadrunners’) (BYG Records 529.705) French release 1964
 "The Roadrunners in Pantomania" EP (2 tracks by the Roadrunners, 1 track by Chris Edwards with the Roadrunners, 1 track by Chris Edwards & Clive Wood) (Cavern Sound 2BSN L7), Feb 1965
 "Star-Club Show 2" (Star-Club Records 148 001 STL), LP shared with Shorty & Them, German release 1965
 "Star-Club Show 2" CD release (Repertoire Records IMS 7014) 1994 CD release features original album plus tracks from Rock Generation Vol. 5 and Pantomania EP

with The Liverpool Scene
 "The Amazing Adventures Of …" (RCA Records SF 7995), 1968
 "Heirloon” (RCA Records SF8134), 1970
 "The Amazing Adventures Of … The Liverpool Scene" (Compilation Double-CD release 2009 on Esoteric Recordings ECLEC22138 featuring non-album tracks)

Mike Hart
 "Mike Hart Bleeds" (Dandelion Records S 63756), 1969
 "Basher, Chalky, Pongo And Me" (Dandelion Records 2310 211), 1972 (released as ‘Mike Hart & Comrades’)
 "Son, Son" / "Bad News Man" (Deram Records DM 409), 1974 single
 "The Lost Sessions"  (Five tracks recorded 1980 for a possible new album; not released on record but remastered and put online for free download)

References

1943 births
2016 deaths
English male poets
English male singer-songwriters
Poets from Liverpool